JaJuan Smith (born December 24, 1985) is an American professional basketball player who last played for Muba Hangtuah Sumatera Selatan of the Indonesian Basketball League. He is an Athens, Tennessee native although he is noted by the press as a Cleveland, Tennessee native.

College career
Smith was a collegiate basketball player who formerly played for the Tennessee Volunteers at the University of Tennessee.

Professional career
Smith was cut by the NBA club the Dallas Mavericks on October 22, 2008. At the end of October 2008, he signed a contract with the Slovenian League club, Union Olimpija of the Euroleague, through the end of 2008-09 season, but he left the team in less than a week due to personal reasons. On December 26, 2008, he signed a short-term contract with French League club Elan Bearnais Pau-Orthez.

In February 2011, JaJuan Smith was signed to play for the Air21 Express in the Philippine Basketball Association.

In September 2014, Smith signed with Glasgow Rocks of the British Basketball League for the 2014–15 season. On January 21, 2015, the Glasgow Rocks announced that JaJuan had left the franchise. On March 24, 2015, he signed with GKK Šibenik of Croatia for the rest of the season.

References

External links
 Eurobasket.com profile
 FIBA.com profile

1985 births
Living people
American expatriate basketball people in Croatia
American expatriate basketball people in Belarus
American expatriate basketball people in Brazil
American expatriate basketball people in Canada
American expatriate basketball people in France
American expatriate basketball people in Spain
American expatriate basketball people in the Philippines
American expatriate basketball people in the United Kingdom
American expatriate basketball people in Turkey
Basketball players from Tennessee
BC Tsmoki-Minsk players
GKK Šibenik players
Élan Béarnais players
Glasgow Rocks players
Philippine Basketball Association imports
Point guards
Saint John Mill Rats players
Shooting guards
Tennessee Volunteers basketball players
Tulsa 66ers players
American men's basketball players
Barako Bull Energy Boosters players